The Popular County Histories series was a set of English county histories issued by Elliott Stock & Co. from 1885.

Notes

Series of books
1880s books
1890s books
English local history